The Riesling Trail is a  long walking and cycling track located in the Clare Valley, South Australia. Established for recreational purposes, it runs between Auburn and Clare, passing through several towns and villages along the way, including Leasingham, Watervale, Penwortham and Sevenhill. The trail is named after Riesling, the most important white grape variety in the Clare Valley wine region.

The Riesling Trail route is part of the former Spalding railway line branch line which ran between Riverton in the south to a northern terminus at Spalding. The section of railway from Riverton to Clare was opened in 1918. Railway stations and sidings along the line were: Rhynie, Undalya, Auburn, Mulkirri (siding), Watervale, Penwortham, Tatkana (siding), Sevenhill, Clare, Kooramo, Barinia, Hilltown, Andrews, and Spalding.

Rail services ceased after the 1983 Ash Wednesday bushfires burnt through the valley and damaged a lot of the trackwork.  In 1989 the rails and steel bridges were removed and in 1993, this part of the route was converted into its present use as a walking and cycle trail.

The Riesling Trail passes through vineyard and farming country. There are various side loops as well as access to wineries, coffee shops, and pubs. Bike hire is available at several locations including Auburn, Clare and the Clare Caravan Park. It is possible to hire bikes and ride one-way with pick-up at the other end. The trail has a gentle up-grade from Auburn to just north of Penwortham, from where it gradually descends into Clare.

See also 
 List of rail trails
Wine tourism
Spring Gully Conservation Park

References

External links
Riesling Trail 'South Australian Trails' webpage
Web site of Friends of the Riesling Trail
Clare Museum History of the Riesling Trail

Cycling in South Australia
Rail trails in Australia
Cycleways in South Australia
Hiking and bushwalking tracks in South Australia
Mid North (South Australia)